Kartalspor is a sports club located in the Kartal district of Istanbul, Turkey. The club's football team plays in the Bank Asya First League after finishing 2nd in the Second League Promotion Group in the 2006–2007 season. Kartal SK started the 2007–2008 season well and was 3rd with half of the games played, but had a disappointing second half of the season and finished 13th. This pattern recurred in the 2008–2009 season, finishing 12th whilst having been 6th halfway through.

The club is well known for its success at developing young players. They have produced players like Fenerbahçe and Turkey national football team goalkeeper Volkan Demirel, national team defender Servet Çetin, and Fenerbahçe former captain Egemen Korkmaz.

The club also has a women's team that finished 3rd in Turkey in 2007.

League participations
 TFF First League: 1988–01, 2007–
 TFF Second League: 1984–88, 2001–07

Current squad

References

Association football clubs established in 1949
 
1949 establishments in Turkey